This was the third edition of the event.

Lukáš Dlouhý and David Miketa, 2001 winners, participated but lost in quarterfinals to the eventual champions.

Karol Beck and Jaroslav Levinský won the title, defeating Aleksandar Kitinov and Lovro Zovko 7–5, 6–2 in the final.

Karol Beck was the runner-up of the previous edition.

Seeds

Draw

References
 Draws on ITF Site

Neridé Prague Indoor